Estadio Capitán San Luis is a multi-use stadium in Pinar del Río, Cuba.

History
Inaugurated the 19 of January 1969, the stadium has a capacity of 8,000 spectators. The stadium is mostly used for baseball games and is the home of the Pinar del Rio Baseball team. Previously, it was the home of Vegueros and Forestales baseball teams and Pinar del Rio, a football team. The football team's home field is now "La Bombonera" in San Cristóbal.

References

1969 establishments in Cuba
Baseball venues in Cuba
Estadio Capitán San Luis
Football venues in Cuba
Estadio Capitán San Luis
Sports venues completed in 1969
20th-century architecture in Cuba